Blue House is a blues album by Marcia Ball. It is her seventh studio album and was released in 1994 by Rounder Records.

Track listing

Personnel
 Marcia Ball - piano and vocals, Hammond B3 on track 8 and 10, accordion on track 6, background vocals on tracks 3 and 7
 Don Bennett - bass, background vocals on track 5
 Rodney Craig - drums, background vocals on track 3, 5 and 7
 Steve Williams - guitar
 Paul Klemperer - saxophone
 Mark Kazanoff - first saxophone solo on track 4 and tenor saxophone solo of track 5.
 The Kamikazi horns on tracks 1, 2, 3, 4, 5 and 10: Mark Kazanoff - tenor saxophone; Red Rails - baritone saxophone; Keith Winking - trumpet; Randy Zimmerman - trombone
 Rich Brotherton - acoustic guitar on track 12 and mandolin on track 7
 David Webb - Hammond B3 on tracks 7 and 9
 Jill Napoletan - background vocals on tracks 3 and 7
 "Mambo" John Treanor - drums on track 11, congas on track 1 and washboard on track 5
 David Kampa - art direction and design
 Scott Van Osdol - photography
 Gordon Fowler - Inspirational Blue House painting

References

1994 albums
Blues albums by American artists
Marcia Ball albums
Rounder Records albums